Alberto Reif (October 14, 1946 – October 15, 2012) was an Italian professional football player. He was born in Spinea.

Honours
 Serie A champion: 1970/71.

References

1946 births
2012 deaths
Italian footballers
Serie A players
S.P.A.L. players
L.R. Vicenza players
Inter Milan players
Hellas Verona F.C. players
Mantova 1911 players
Association football forwards